The 2003 Japanese Motorcycle Grand Prix was the first round of the 2003 MotoGP Championship. It took place on the weekend of 4–6 April 2003 at Suzuka. The meeting was overshadowed by the death of Daijiro Kato in the MotoGP race, after he crashed at 130R and hit the barrier at high speed in the ensuing Casio Triangle. Since the accident, Suzuka has failed to reappear on the calendar, with the Japanese Grand Prix moving to Twin Ring Motegi, the previous home of the Pacific Grand Prix.

MotoGP classification
After the Friday timed sessions Norifumi Abe, who was already competing in the event as a wild card entry, was designated as the replacement rider for the injured Marco Melandri.

250 cc classification

125 cc classification

Championship standings after the race (motoGP)

Below are the standings for the top five riders and constructors after round one has concluded.

Riders' Championship standings

Constructors' Championship standings

 Note: Only the top five positions are included for both sets of standings.

References

Japanese motorcycle Grand Prix
Motorcycle racing controversies
Japanese
Motorcycle Grand Prix